Ancepitilobus is a genus of spiders in the family Salticidae. It was first described in 2016 by Richardson. , it contains only one species, Ancepitilobus howensis, found on Lord Howe Island. Its taxonomic relationships within the family are unknown.

References

Salticidae
Monotypic Salticidae genera
Spiders of Australia